Kalininskaya is a rural locality (a stanitsa) and the administrative center of Kalininsky District of Krasnodar Krai, Russia, located on the Beysug River. Population:

References

Rural localities in Krasnodar Krai
Kalininsky District, Krasnodar Krai